The Fleet Solid Support Ship Programme (FSSP) aims to deliver up to three fleet solid support ships to the British Royal Fleet Auxiliary. The ships will be used to provide underway replenishment of dry stores, such as ammunition, spare parts and supplies, to ships of the Royal Navy. They will regularly deploy with the UK Carrier Strike Group, providing crucial supplies to the s and their escorts. All three ships are scheduled to enter service between 20282032.

The ships were first proposed by the British government in 2015 as part of the Strategic Defence and Security Review. In the subsequent National Shipbuilding Strategy, the government outlined its intentions to tender the ships internationally to encourage competitiveness with British shipyards. This was criticised by some political parties and trade unions as being a potential loss of British shipbuilding jobs and skills. Following a competition, which began in 2018, Team Resolute was awarded a contract for the three vessels; BMT Group will provide the design, whilst Harland & Wolff and Navantia UK will construct them.

Background

In November 2015, the British government published the Strategic Defence and Security Review which outlined a commitment to three new solid support ships by 2025. The ships are replacements for the RFA's  and  fleet solid support ships which had grown increasingly obsolete; one ship, RFA Fort Victoria, underwent modernisation in 2017, which made her the only fleet solid support ship compatible with the new Queen Elizabeth-class aircraft carriers, whilst the remaining ships were withdrawn from service. In the National Shipbuilding Strategy, published in 2017, the government stated that the contract for the ships would be subject to an international competition, pitting UK firms against those overseas in order to encourage competitiveness. The government also described the ships as "non-warships", which allowed them to be tendered internationally under the European Union's Treaty on the Functioning of the European Union (TFEU).

The government's strategy was criticised as a potential loss of British skills and jobs by opposition political parties and trade unions, such as GMB and the Confederation of Shipbuilding and Engineering Unions. They argued that the ships should be reclassified as warships and therefore made exempt from the treaty. Sir John Parker, whose recommendations formed the basis for the National Shipbuilding Strategy, also criticised it as "not the right strategic approach" and recommended that "UK-only competition should be considered for future defence-funded vessels".

Development

Contract
In November 2018, a list of bidders was selected for the FSS contract which consisted of a British consortium comprising Babcock, BAE Systems, Cammell Laird and Rolls-Royce, in addition to international bidders, including Fincantieri (Italy), Navantia (Spain), Japan Marine United Corporation (Japan) and Daewoo Shipbuilding and Marine Engineering (South Korea). Fincantieri and DSME later withdrew from the competition, but Fincantieri subsequently rejoined.

The competition was suspended on 5 November 2019 to ensure "requirements could be met" and a "value for money solution found", which raised hopes from trade unions that the competition would be restarted with only British firms involved. In the following month, Defence Secretary Ben Wallace made a statement describing the ships as "warships" and later confirmed that they would be built "with British involvement". A restart for the competition was announced for Spring 2021, involving multi-national consortia led by British companies. In May 2021, the competition was relaunched with a winner to be selected within two years. In July 2022, Rear-Admiral Paul Marshall, the Senior Responsible Officer for programme, told the Defence Select Committee that the first ship was envisaged for service entry in 2028 with the third entering service by 2032.

In September 2021, contracts were awarded to four consortia, each involving British companies, to further develop their bids. These were Larsen & Toubro (involving the UK company Leidos Innovations), Serco/Damen (involving UK company Serco), Team Resolute (involving UK companies Harland & Wolff (H&W) and BMT, along with Navantia UK, a British subsidiary of Spain's Navantia) and Team UK (involving UK companies BAE Systems and Babcock).

In November 2022, it was announced that Team Resolute had been selected as the preferred bidder for the £1.6 billion contract. Navantia UK was confirmed as the prime contractor with the ships being fully assembled in H&W's shipyard in Belfast. To alleviate concerns from some MPs and trade unions, the CEO of H&W, John Wood, stated that the ships would have a minimum of 60% UK content. The contract will create 1,200 jobs across the UK and a further 800 across the supply chain. It will also mark the return of shipbuilding in Belfast, which has been largely dormant since 2003. The manufacturing contract, with a value of 1.6 billion pounds, was formally signed in January 2023.

Construction
The ships will be constructed in blocks at H&W's facilities in Belfast and Appledore from components manufactured at their facilities in Methil and Arnish. Some build work will also take place at Navantia's shipyard in Cádiz, Spain. Final assembly of all the blocks will take place at the H&W shipyard in Belfast.

Characteristics
The ships' hangars will be able to accommodate two Merlin helicopters, with further accommodation for UAVs.

References

Royal Fleet Auxiliary